Lake Menghough was an intermittent lake in the southeast of Algeria. It is described in the account of the first Flatters expedition, which reached the lake in April 1880. Other European visitors found the lake dry or filled depending on rainfall.

Location

The lake was to the east of the Tassili n'Ajjer.
The Flatters expedition came to it when travelling southeast along the well-wooded Irhararer valley (Oued i-n-Karaha?) to the point where it joined the Tijoujelt valley, not far from Tajenout.
At this point, the surplus waters of the Tijoujelt during the rainy season empty into lake Menghough.
Lake Menghough is located on the northern shore of the Wadi of the same name.
The sheet of water is enclosed in a sort of circle surrounded by high dunes beside the Wadi Tidjoudjelt, an affluent of the Wadi Igharghar.

Flatters expedition

The first Flatters expedition left Biskra early in February 1880 and travelled south by Touggourt, Ouargla, Aïn-el-Taïba and Temassinin.
The expedition encamped on shores of Lake Menghough on 16 April 1880.
The other shores were low and clayey.
They found yellow-eyed Clarias lazera (African sharptooth catfish) in the lake.
The Tuaregs could not supply any information about the tombs.
With provisions running short and the local people showing hostility, Flatters decided to return by the same route.

A member of the Flatters expedition reported that:

Later expeditions

The French explorer Gaston Méry visited the lake in 1893 after a long period of drought, and found it completely dry.
Méry was the first French explorer to visit the region since the massacre of the second Flatters expedition.
He and Guilloux were accompanied by five local Algerians.
At Lake Menghough Méry met with some of the Kel Ajjer chiefs. 

Antoine Bernard d'Attanoux found water in the lake when he visited it in March 1894.  
This was in a rainy period, and the rains in the preceding weeks had overwhelmed the wadis and turned the plain into a vast swamp.
The expedition had to avoid the valley floors and travel with some difficulty by the higher land.
Attanoux could not approach the lake very closely, and set up his camp a few kilometers to the southwest at the mouth of the Wadi Timatouiet.
Attanoux noted that Colonel Flatters had thought the lake was fed by an underground source, and that this was plausible despite the lake drying up, since there was no permanent water table in the region and the source could therefore have dried up.
He reported that the Ighargharen valley with its sand-clay soils seemed to have great potential for agriculture, particularly cereals.
Boreholes would be enough to find water from the rains that sometimes fall in several consecutive years.
However, the nomadic Tuaregs did not practice agriculture.

Notes

Sources

Lakes of Algeria